Dharshini David is a British author, economist and broadcaster. After working at HSBC, BBC News and Tesco, she became a business correspondent and news presenter for Sky News in 2009. She returned to the BBC in 2018.

Early life 
David was born and brought up in London. David was educated at the James Allen's Girls' School in Dulwich, South London, and read Economics at Downing College, Cambridge. She has also worked for independent think tank Oxford Economic Forecasting, for the UK's Government Economic Service, and for HSBC Investment Bank as its UK Economist in London.

Broadcasting career 
David joined the BBC in 2000 as an economics correspondent. She worked on national BBC1 bulletins, BBC News 24, and on its international counterpart BBC World. She also presented for the BBC's current affairs series Panorama, BBC One news and BBC Radio. She was appointed the BBC's New York Business Presenter in July 2006 and presented World Business Report from New York. and covered the emergence of the credit crunch from Wall Street.

In September 2009, she joined Sky News as a business and economics correspondent. She latterly presented business news bulletins and programmes for Sky, including the flagship business programmes "Jeff Randall Live" and "Business Live", and also presented "Sky News Tonight" and other general news programmes.

By 2018, David was back at BBC News as Senior Economics correspondent. In January 2020, she was appointed BBC News' first Global Trade Correspondent. She also presents the business news for the Today programme and other shows for Radio 4.

Writing
David's first book, The Almighty Dollar: Follow the Incredible Journey of a Single Dollar to See How the Global Economy Really Works, was published by Elliott & Thompson in February 2018.

References

External links 
 Pre-Budget report: BBC's Dharshini David BBC News, 28 November 2001
 

Living people
Alumni of Downing College, Cambridge
English people of Sri Lankan Tamil descent
English reporters and correspondents
English television presenters
BBC newsreaders and journalists
BBC World News
Sky News newsreaders and journalists
HSBC people
People educated at James Allen's Girls' School
English economists
Writers from London
Year of birth missing (living people)